The Wailers, or Bob Marley and the Wailers, were a Jamaican reggae group from 1963 to 1981.

The Wailers may also refer to:

 The Wailers Band, a reggae band formed in 1981 after Marley's death
 The Original Wailers, a reggae group formed in 2008 by Al Anderson and Junior Marvin
 The Fabulous Wailers, or The Wailers, an American rock band from 1958 to 1969

See also